The Glickenhaus SCG 007 LMH is a sports prototype racing car built by Scuderia Cameron Glickenhaus for the Le Mans Hypercar category in the FIA World Endurance Championship.

History
In 2018, the FIA and ACO approved the new Le Mans Hypercar regulation as a replacement for the LMP1 regulation in the World Endurance Championship that would come into effect from the 2021 season. On July 27, 2018, Scuderia Cameron Glickenhaus was the first manufacturer to join the new category, as well as officially presenting the car they would race with, the Glickenhaus SCG 007 LMH.

Development
The car is developed by Podium Advanced Technologies. The car uses a 3.5L twin-turbocharged V8 developed by PIPO Moteurs.

Complete World Endurance Championship results
Results in bold indicate pole position. Results in italics indicate fastest lap.

* Season still in progress.

References

007 LMH
Le Mans Hypercars
24 Hours of Le Mans race cars
Sports prototypes